Tutong Sixth Form Centre (Malay, abbreviated) is a sixth form centre in Tutong District, Brunei. It first opened its doors in 2012, and since then, accepts mainly secondary school leavers from the district.

Background 
The school campus is located at Bukit Beruang, some 14 kilometres from the town of Tutong and about 60 kilometres from Bandar Seri Begawan.

The construction began in 2009 and took 20 months to complete. It is estimated to have cost roughly 20 million Brunei dollars.

It is the first dedicated sixth form centre in the district. Sixth form education for the district began in 2002 but was run under the administration of Sayyidina 'Othman Secondary School and thus shared facilities with the school's secondary education. In 2012, it moved to the current compound which is not far from its former location.

Programme 
Tutong Sixth Form Centre offers GCE A Level programme. Studies usually begin in early March and end with A Level examinations in October and November of the following year.

This sixth form centre mainly enrols students who have completed 4- or 5-year secondary education in the district's five secondary schools — namely Muda Hashim Secondary School, Raja Isteri Pengiran Anak Saleha Secondary School, Sayyidina 'Othman Secondary School, Sufri Bolkiah Secondary School and Tanjong Maya Secondary School — and who wish to pursue sixth form rather than vocational education.

Facilities 
The school sits on an area of 15 acres. Facilities that can be found here include:
 Blocks for:
 Administration
 Classrooms
 Science laboratories
 Art studio and design technology room
 Multi-purpose hall
 Library
 Canteen
 Assembly area
 Athletic field

References 

Sixth form colleges in Brunei
Cambridge schools in Brunei
Educational institutions established in 2012
2012 establishments in Brunei